James Panayi (born 24 January 1980) is an English former professional footballer who played as a defender for Watford between 1998 and 2002.

He made his professional debut in a Premier League match at Coventry City's Highfield Road stadium on Sunday 31 October 1999.

After leaving Watford in 2002 he had a trial with Queens Park Rangers, later joining Cypriot side Apollon Limassol.

He is now head of physical education at Sprowston Community Academy, having previously worked at Cliff Park High School and Flegg High School.

References

Since 1888... The Searchable Premiership and Football League Player Database (subscription required)

1980 births
Living people
English footballers
Association football defenders
Premier League players
Cypriot First Division players
Watford F.C. players
Apollon Limassol FC players
English people of Greek Cypriot descent
Schoolteachers from Norfolk
Footballers from Hammersmith